

Champions
Temple Cup: Baltimore Orioles over Boston Beaneaters (4–1)
National League: Boston Beaneaters

National League final standings

National League statistical leaders

Batting average: Willie Keeler – .424
Home runs: Hugh Duffy – 11
Runs batted in: George Davis – 135
Wins: Kid Nichols – 31
Earned run average: Amos Rusie – 2.54
Strikeouts: Doc McJames and Cy Seymour – 156

Notable seasons
Baltimore Orioles right fielder Willie Keeler led the NL in batting average (.424) and hits (239). He was second in the NL in total bases (304), slugging percentage (.539), adjusted OPS+ (164), and runs scored (145). He was third in the NL in on-base percentage (.464).
Boston Beaneaters pitcher Kid Nichols had a win–loss record of 31–11 and led the NL in innings pitched (368), wins (31), and adjusted ERA+ (168). He was second in the NL in earned run average (2.64). He was fifth in the NL in strikeouts (127).

Events
June 24 – Dick Harley of the St. Louis Browns collects six hits in one game against the Pittsburgh Pirates.
June 29 – The Chicago Colts defeat the Louisville Colonels 36-7 - still the record for the most runs by one team in a game.
July 18 – Cap Anson of the Chicago Colts collects his 3,000th career hit with a single off of Baltimore Orioles pitcher George Blackburn.
September 18 – Cy Young pitches the first no-hitter of his career as the Cleveland Spiders defeat the Cincinnati Reds, 6-0, in the first game of a doubleheader.

Births

January
January 1 – Monty Swartz
January 3 – Pete Turgeon
January 5 – Art Delaney
January 6 – Buck Crouse
January 6 – By Speece
January 7 – Topper Rigney
January 9 – Dave Keefe
January 15 – Joe Genewich
January 24 – George Ellison
January 29 – Pat Patterson

February
February 9 – Adrian Lynch
February 11 – Red Miller
February 11 – Joe Shannon
February 11 – Red Shannon
February 14 – Earl Smith
February 15 – Art Johnson
February 15 – Chuck Wolfe
February 16 – Paul Castner
February 16 – Alex Ferguson
February 17 – Ike Boone
February 18 – Huck Betts
February 25 – Bob Vines

March
March 1 – Howie Jones
March 4 – Neal Brady
March 4 – Lefty O'Doul
March 5 – Virgil Barnes
March 5 – Lu Blue
March 6 – Cliff Brady
March 9 – Joe Dawson
March 10 – Russ Ennis
March 13 – Lew Malone
March 14 – Bruce Hitt
March 19 – Elmer Bowman
March 21 – Gus Ketchum
March 21 – Bill Lamar
March 27 – Joe Lucey
March 27 – Effa Manley
March 30 – Ed Sicking

April
April 4 – Ray Miner
April 8 – Dick Attreau
April 10 – Joe Price
April 10 – Ross Youngs
April 15 – Walt Lynch
April 20 – Lou Vedder
April 26 – Epp Sell
April 30 – Walt Walsh

May
May 3 – Ray Shepardson
May 12 – Joe Dugan
May 13 – Hugh Canavan
May 17 – Harry Riconda
May 20 – Wilcy Moore
May 30 – Wally Kimmick

June
June 6 – Ray Pierce
June 12 – Guy Lacy
June 13 – George Foss
June 15 – Cy Twombly
June 17 – Bill Hubbell
June 22 – Bill Mizeur
June 25 – Camp Skinner
June 29 – Grady Adkins

July
July 3 – Chet Nichols Sr.
July 3 – Heinie Sand
July 5 – Tom Miller
July 9 – Glenn Myatt
July 12 – Hod Fenner
July 16 – Hi Bell
July 18 – Hank Hulvey
July 18 – Pat Murray
July 18 – Ed Sherling
July 22 – Ed Gerner
July 23 – Hod Ford
July 23 – Cy Fried
July 26 – Chick Bowen
July 27 – Biz Mackey
July 29 – Jim Hamby

August
August 8 – Charlie Eckert
August 8 – Ken Holloway
August 10 – Frank Welch
August 16 – Bob Fothergill
August 17 – Joe Bradshaw
August 17 – Ed Lennon
August 18 – Mandy Brooks
August 22 – Bob Clark
August 24 – Al Bool
August 24 – Frank Pratt
August 29 – John Quinn
August 31 – William Bell

September
September 13 – Eddie Rommel
September 17 – Joe Green
September 17 – Earl Webb
September 19 – Astyanax Douglass
September 23 – Walt Irwin
September 25 – Walter Anderson
September 27 – Chick Gagnon
September 30 – Eddie Kenna
September 30 – Mike Kircher

October
October 7 – Bill Jackman
October 9 – Harry Biemiller
October 13 – Elliot Bigelow
October 14 – Vance McIlree
October 15 – Dinty Gearin
October 15 – Sam Gray
October 16 – Garland Buckeye
October 18 – Sumpter Clarke
October 19 – Tom Lovelace
October 20 – Tom Connelly
October 20 – Jigger Statz
October 22 – Myles Thomas
October 26 – Skipper Friday
October 26 – George Winn
October 29 – Ty Pickup
October 30 – Kettle Wirts
October 31 – Tony Rego

November
November 4 – Ted Menze
November 4 – Dolly Stark
November 5 – Jack Ogden
November 9 – Johnny Gooch
November 9 – Harvey Hendrick
November 17 – Davey Claire
November 17 – Rube Lutzke
November 20 – Larry Benton
November 21 – Andy High
November 23 – Bubber Jonnard
November 23 – Claude Jonnard
November 23 – Freddy Leach
November 23 – Beans Reardon
November 26 – Bill Warwick
November 30 – Win Ballou
November 30 – Dud Branom

December
December 10 – Jocko Conlon
December 10 – Tim Griesenbeck
December 11 – Slim Harriss
December 14 – Syl Simon
December 16 – Fred Wigington
December 18 – Lance Richbourg
December 19 – Mike Herrera
December 20 – Snooks Dowd
December 21 – Hal Haid
December 21 – Pete Scott
December 22 – Harvey Freeman
December 23 – Nemo Gaines
December 25 – Allen Elliott
December 27 – Jackie Tavener

Deaths
February 5 – Old Hoss Radbourn, 42, Hall of Fame pitcher who won over 300 games including a record 60 for the 1884 Providence Grays, leading the National League in wins, strikeouts, winning percentage and games twice each and in shutouts, innings and ERA once each; completing 489 out of 503 starts, pitching three shutouts in the 1884 World Championship Series, while holding single-season records for games pitched with 76 in 1883, going 27–12 for the 1890 Players' League champions.
February 8 – Fleury Sullivan, 35, pitcher.
March 5 – Dave Foutz, 40, first baseman/outfielder/pitcher who played from 1884 through 1896 for the St. Louis Browns and the Brooklyn Bridegrooms/Grooms, a three-time .300 hitter and manager for the Brooklyn teams between 1893 and 1896 for a .690 career winning percentage, while pitching 41 wins for the 1886 champion Browns.
March 10 – Wes Blogg, 42, catcher.
March 21 – Andy Allison, 49, first baseman.
March 22 – Dave Anderson, 28, pitcher.
March 25 – Bill Quarles, 28, pitcher.
April 13 – Charlie Yingling, 31, shortstop.
July 10 – Kid Baldwin, 32, catcher.
August 1 – Jake Seymour, 43, who played for the Pittsburgh Alleghenys of the American Association in the 1882 season.
August 4 – John Gilroy, 27, pitcher.
August 9 – Jack Scheible, 31, pitcher.
August 19 – Jim McKeever, 36, catcher.
August 22 – Tricky Nichols, 47, pitcher who posted a 28–73 record and a 3.06 ERA in 106 games for six different teams between 1875 and 1882.
August 27 – Sam Moran, 26, pitcher.
October 9 – Milo Lockwood, 39, outfielder and pitcher.
October 19 – O. P. Caylor, 47, one of the founders of the American Association.
November 2 – Joe Sullivan, 27, shortstop.
November 15 – Charlie Smith, 56, infielder who appeared in 14 games for the 1871 New York Mutuals.
November 19 – Frank McGinn, 28, infielder.
December 20 – William Brown, 31, catcher.

References

1897 National League team stats at Baseball Reference